Dialectometry is the quantitative and computational branch of dialectology, the study of dialect. This sub-field of linguistics studies language variation using the methods of statistics; it arose in the 1970s and 80s as a result of seminal work by J. Séguy and Hans Goebl.

The research concentrates mainly on the regional distribution of dialect similarities, such as cores of dialect and overlapping zones, which can be labelled according to a more or less slight variance of dialect between bordering locations. However, analysis of dialect relationships  cannot always be clearly depicted by cladistics, since there are often dialect continuum cases and also examples with elements of convergence, as well as division.

Language atlases serve as an empirical database which document the dialect profile of a large number of locations in detail. Different well-known numerical classification methodologies are used to abstract and visualise a basic pattern from the immense amount of data found in the language atlases.

Not one solid classification can be expected to result from the calculations; rather, different aspects of the basic pattern being searched for can be discovered by using the different methodologies. Principally speaking, there is more interest in the diversity of the taxometric methodologies, the results and the linguistic interpretations which can be made from them.

References

Further reading 
 Bauer, Roland. 2002-2003. Dolomitenladinische Ähnlichkeitsprofile aus dem Gadertal. Ein Werkstattbericht zur dialektometrischen Analyse des ALD-I, in: Ladinia XXVI-XXVII, 209-250.
 Bauer, Roland. 2003. Sguardo dialettometrico su alcune zone di transizione dell'Italia nord-orientale (lombardo vs. trentino vs. veneto), in: Parallela X. Sguardi reciproci. Vicende linguistiche e culturali dell'area italofona e germanofona. Atti del Decimo Incontro italo-austriaco dei linguisti, Bombi, Raffaella / Fusco, Fabiana (Hrsg.), Udine: Forum Editrice, 93-119.
 Bauer, Roland. 2004. Dialekte - Dialektmerkmale - dialektale Spannungen. Von "Cliquen", "Störenfrieden" und "Sündenböcken" im Netz des dolomitenladinischen Sprachatlasses ALD-I, in: Ladinia XXVIII, 201-242.
 Bauer, Roland. 2005. La classificazione dialettometrica dei basiletti altoitaliani e ladini rappresentati nell'Atlante linguistico del ladino dolomitico e dei dialetti limitrofi (ALD-I), in: Lingue, istituzioni, territori. Riflessioni teoriche, proposte metodologiche ed esperienze di politica linguistica, Guardiano, Cristina et al. (Hrsg.), Roma: Bulzoni, 347-365.
 Goebl, Hans. 1982. Dialektometrie; Prinzipien und Methoden des Einsatzes der numerischen Taxonomie im Bereich der Dialektgeographie. Wien: Verlag der Öst. Akademie der Wissenschaften.
 Goebl, Hans. 1984. Dialektometrische Studien anhand italoromanischer, rätoromanischer und galloromanischer Sprachmaterialien aus AIS und ALF. Bd.1 (Bd.2 und 3 enthalten Karten und Tabellen). Tübingen: Max Niemeyer.
 Goebl, Hans. 1985. Coup d'oeil dialectométrique sur les Tableaux phonétiques des patois suisses romands, in: Vox romanica 44, 189-233.
 Goebl, Hans. 1986. Muster, Strukturen und Systeme in der Sprachgeographie. In: Mondo Ladino X, 41-70.
 Goebl, Hans. 1987. Encore un coup d'œil dialectométrique sur les Tableaux phonétiques des patois suisses romands (TPPSR). Deux analyses interponctuelles: parquet polygonal et treillis triangulaire, in: Vox romanica 46, 91-125.
 Goebl, Hans. 1993. Die dialektale Gliederung Ladiniens aus der Sicht der Ladiner. Eine Pilotstudie zum Problem der geolinguistischen "Mental Maps". In: Ladinia XVII, 59-95.
 Goebl, Hans. 1994. Spannungsverhältnis in dialektalen Netzen; ein Hinweis zu disziplinübergreifender Diskussion. In: Computatio linguae II, Ursula Klenk (Hrsg.), 63-83.
 Goebl, Hans. 1998. Dialektometrische Beschreibung der Romania. In: Lexikon der Romanistischen Linguistik (LRL), Holtus, Günter / Metzeltin, Michael / Schmitt, Christian (Hrsg.), Band VII, Tübingen: Niemeyer, 977-1003.

External links 
 Dialectometry.com
 Visual DialectoMetry - Windows program to manage and visualize dialectometry data
 University of Salzburg: Dr.Hans Goebl
 RuG/L04, software download

Dialectology
Quantitative linguistics